Mädchen Elaina Amick (born December 12, 1970) is an American actress and television director. She is known for her starring role as Shelly Johnson on the television series Twin Peaks (1990–1991), its prequel film Twin Peaks: Fire Walk with Me (1992) and its revival television series Twin Peaks: The Return (2017). She was a series regular on Central Park West (1995–1996), Freddie (2005–2006), and Witches of East End (2013–2014). In film, she had starring roles in Sleepwalkers (1992) and Dream Lover (1993). She portrays Alice Smith on The CW's drama television series Riverdale (2017–present).

Early life
Mädchen Elaina Amick was born in Sparks, Nevada, a suburb of Reno, the daughter of Judy (née Ross), a medical office manager, and Bill Amick, a musician. Amick's parents are of partial German descent; the name Mädchen, which means "girl" in German, was chosen by her parents because they wanted an unusual name. She is also of Norwegian, Swedish, English and Irish descent. As a young girl, Amick was encouraged by her parents to follow her creative instincts. She learned to play the piano, bass, violin and guitar and took lessons in tap, ballet, jazz and modern dance. In 1987, at the age of 16, she moved to Los Angeles to pursue a career in acting.

Career
After moving to Los Angeles, Amick began her career with guest roles on Star Trek: The Next Generation (1989) and Baywatch (1989). Amick got her first break when director David Lynch chose her to play waitress Shelly Johnson on the television series Twin Peaks (1990–1991). Amick's character endured physical abuse at the hands of her criminal husband, Leo, and was one of the most popular characters. Amick went on to work twice more with Lynch—reprising her role as Shelly in the prequel film Twin Peaks: Fire Walk with Me (1992) and in seven episodes of the 2017 Twin Peaks revival series.

In 1990, Amick was cast as Mandy in Don't Tell Her It's Me and portrayed Amy in Tobe Hooper's horror film I'm Dangerous Tonight. In 1991, Amick was cast in The Borrower. In 1992, Amick portrayed the heroine Tanya Robertson in the Stephen King horror film Sleepwalkers. The following year, she starred in the thriller film Love, Cheat & Steal (1993).

In 1993, Amick was cast as Lena Mathers in the feature film Dream Lover, a thriller in which she co-starred with James Spader. In 1995, she and Spader were reunited in the TV movie The Courtyard. That same year, Amick appeared in the romantic comedy French Exit. In 1996, Amick was cast in the science fiction thriller Bombshell. Amick's return to network television came in the fall of 1995 with the much-publicized CBS primetime soap opera Central Park West. In 1997, she appeared in the film Wounded. In 1998, Amick costarred for one season in the reboot of Fantasy Island on ABC alongside Malcolm McDowell.

After a decade of roles that failed to ignite the publicity Twin Peaks had, Amick gradually became a noticeable face in television with recurring roles on Gilmore Girls, ER, Jake in Progress, and Joey. In 2006, Amick was a regular in the sitcom Freddie which was subsequently cancelled.

Amick guest-starred in a number of episodes of the serial thriller Kidnapped on NBC, playing a strange and deadly assassin. She also had a recurring role in the second season of Dawson's Creek as the lead character's substitute film studies teacher. In 2007, she had a lead role in the short-lived CBS musical series Viva Laughlin.

Amick had a recurring role in season 2 of Gossip Girl as Nate Archibald's "cougar" love interest, and she also appears in the second season of the Showtime series Californication. In 2008, Amick starred as Christian Slater's wife on the NBC series My Own Worst Enemy. In 2010, Amick played Danielle Marchetti on the FX series Damages.

In 2011 she appeared in the post-apocalyptic film Priest. In 2013, Amick began starring in the Lifetime supernatural drama Witches of East End opposite Julia Ormond, Rachel Boston and Jenna Dewan. Amick's character Wendy Beauchamp was originally a guest star, but she became a permanent character after shooting the pilot episode. On August 6, 2015, Amick joined the cast of American Horror Story: Hotel as a mother whose son is ailing. Since 2017, Amick has starred as Alice Cooper, Betty Cooper's mother, on the CW television series Riverdale.

Personal life
Amick married then-boyfriend of 8 years David Alexis on December 16, 1995. Together they have two children: son Sylvester Time Amick-Alexis (born July 5, 1992) and daughter Mina Tobias Amick-Alexis (born September 2, 1993, and known professionally as Mina Tobias). Tobias, a musician, released her single "Freedom" in 2018, the music video for which pays homage to Twin Peaks.

Filmography

Film

Television

Music videos

References

External links

 Official website

Living people
1970 births
20th-century American actresses
21st-century American actresses
Actresses from Nevada
American film actresses
American people of English descent
American people of German descent
American people of Irish descent
American people of Norwegian descent
American people of Swedish descent
American television actresses
People from Sparks, Nevada